Belgian-German relations are the interstate relations between Belgium and Germany. Both of these are neighbouring countries and share a common 204 kilometer long landborder.  Both nations are members of NATO, the European Union and the Eurozone.

Belgium has an embassy in Berlin, a consul in Cologne as well as an honorary consulate in Duisburg, Frankfurt am Main, Munich, Aachen, Hamburg, Stuttgart, and Bremen, while Germany has an Embassy in Brussels. They also have honorary consuls in Liège, Hasselt, Antwerp, and Eupen.

According to the Federal Statistical Office, around 56,000 Belgians currently live in Germany, and Around 40,000 Germans living in Belgium in 2021.

Some German cities (like Hanau and Cologne) are or were traditional centres of Belgian Protestant Diaspora. German is besides Dutch and French also the third official language in Belgium. The German-speaking Community of Belgium is the smallest of the three political communities in Belgium.

History 
The modern territory of Belgium, along with Germany, had been part of the Holy Roman Empire for centuries until the end of the 18th century. The first king of Belgium after Belgium gained its independence in 1830 was Leopold I, who hailed from the aristocratic family of Saxe-Coburg and Gotha. To date, all Belgian kings stem from his lineage.

The territory currently comprising the German-speaking community in Belgium was taken from Germany following World War I, as stipulated the Treaty of Versailles as compensation for the Allied countries.

See also
 Foreign relations of Belgium
 Foreign relations of Germany

References